Caroline Winterer is an American historian. She is the William Robertson Coe Professor of History and American Studies at Stanford University. She is also Professor, by courtesy, of Classics. From 2013 to 2019, she was Director of the Stanford Humanities Center. She received her B.A. from Pomona College and her Ph.D. from the University of Michigan.

Her expertise is American history before 1900, especially the history of ideas, political theory, and the history of science.

Books

 T ime in Maps: From the Age of Discovery to Our Digital Era (Chicago: University of Chicago Press, 2020), edited with Karen Wigen.
 American Enlightenments: Pursuing Happiness in the Age of Reason, Yale University Press, 2016, 
 "What Was the American Enlightenment?" in The Worlds of American Intellectual History, eds. Joel Isaac, James Kloppenberg, and Jennifer Ratner-Rosenhagen, Oxford University Press, 2016 (ISBN forthcoming)
 The American Enlightenment: Treasures from the Stanford University Libraries']' (Stanford: Stanford University Libraries, 2011), 
 [http://www.cornellpress.cornell.edu/book/?GCOI=80140100351740 The Mirror of Antiquity: American Women and the Classical Tradition, 1750-1900 (Ithaca: Cornell University Press, 2007; pb 2009), 
 The Culture of Classicism: Ancient Greece and Rome in American Intellectual Life, 1780-1910 (Baltimore: Johns Hopkins University Press, 2002; pb 2004), 

Awards

 American Ingenuity Award, Smithsonian Institution, for mapping the social network of Benjamin Franklin (2013)

Notes

External links
 Featured in Smithsonian Magazine: http://www.smithsonianmag.com/innovation/dear-sir-ben-franklin-would-like-to-add-you-to-his-network-180947639/?no-ist
 "'Enlightenment': America's Semantic Shield for the Cold War," The Takeaway (WNYC) (Oct. 26, 2016): http://www.wnyc.org/story/enlightenment-americas-semantic-shield-cold-war/
 "Stanford Historian Makes Case for American 'Enlightenments,'" Forum'' (KQED) (Nov. 30, 2016): https://ww2.kqed.org/forum/2016/11/29/stanford-historian-makes-case-for-american-enlightenments/

Year of birth missing (living people)
Living people
21st-century American historians
Stanford University faculty
University of Michigan alumni
Pomona College alumni
21st-century American women writers
American women historians
Historians from California